Ghettoblaster is the seventh studio album by Armand Van Helden. The vocals in I Want Your Soul were sampled from "Do You Want It Right Now" by Siedah Garrett. The album was released in a special edition 2-disc set as well as the standard edition. Some of the tracks are throwbacks to freestyle music which was popular in the 1980s.

Track listing 

Standard Edition/Special Edition Disc 1
Go Crazy! [feat. Majida] (6:50)
Touch Your Toes (Original 12-Inch) [feat. Fat Joe & BL] (5:32)
I Want Your Soul (6:37)
NYC Beat (6:29)
Playing House  [feat. Kudu] (6:01)
This Ain't Hollywood  [feat. Will 'Tha Wiz' Lemay] (3:50)
Still In Love [feat. Karmen] (6:02)
Playmate [feat. Roxy Cottontail & Lacole 'Tigga' Campbell] (4:25)
Je T'Aime [feat. Nicole Roux] (7:18)
To Be A Freak [feat. George Llanes] (6:41)
All Night [feat. La Rocka] (4:31)
A Track Called Jack (6:17)

Special Edition Disc 2
Nyc Beat (MSTRKRFT Remix)
I Want Your Soul (TV Rock Remix)
Touch Your Toes (Stretch Armstrong 12")
Nyc Beat (Detroit Mix)
I Want Your Soul (Tommy Trash Remix)
Touch Your Toes (Featuring Fat Joe & BL)
I Want Your Soul (Wizard's Breaks Mix Featuring Mc Ivory)
A Track Called Jack (Jahawi's Jackin' Off Remix)
Playmate (Feat. Roxy Cottontail + Lacole 'tigga' Campbell) (Jesse Rose Remix)
Nyc Beat (Emperor Machine Remix)
Touch Your Toes (Serge Santiago Remix)

Charts

Release history

References 

2007 albums
Armand Van Helden albums
Southern Fried Records albums